Abu'l Hasan ibn Arfa Ra's (died 1197) was an alchemist from Al-Andalus, who lived most of his life during the Almohad period. In his works he develops a theoretical and terminological framework of experimental process and basic laboratory techniques still recognizable today.

He is the author of Shudhur al-Dhahab, a renowned work on theoretical and practical experiments in chemistry. It describes the properties of various metals and has provided detailed information on enamelled ceramics and the various techniques, methods and processes of industrial chemistry of the time. The famous book contains the greatest poetic alchemical text of the Muslim world. This book, one of the major books of Arab alchemical science, is adorned with stylized illustrations of stills (in the text) and more recent and well-delineated illustrations of alchemic equipment, which are found in the margins, drawn with red and black inks in glossy paper. The poem, 1460 verses, having as rhymes the 28 letters of the Arabic alphabet, is preserved today in a large number of manuscripts. Many commentaries on his alchemist poems come from his successors, inspired by his work, including the chemist Al Jildaki, and by him Maghreb chemistry is studied in the Mashriq.

Virtually nothing is known of his life, except that he died in 1197 in Fez in modern day Morocco.

Notes

References
 

1197 deaths
Year of birth missing
Alchemists of the medieval Islamic world
12th-century Arabic writers
Scientists from al-Andalus
Almohad scholars
Almohad poets